Russell J. Eddie (born June 9, 1938) was an American politician in the state of Iowa.

Eddie was born in Wayne, Nebraska. He attended Buena Vista College and was a farmer. He served in the Iowa House of Representatives from 1987 to 2003, as a Republican.

References

1938 births
Living people
Republican Party members of the Iowa House of Representatives
People from Wayne, Nebraska
Farmers from Iowa
Farmers from Nebraska
Buena Vista University alumni